Frederick Ronald Cohen (1945 – January 16, 2022) was an American mathematician working in algebraic topology.

Education and career 
Fred Cohen was born in 1945 in Chicago.  He received a BA from Brandeis University in 1967 and a PhD from the University of Chicago in 1972.  He taught at the University of Northern Illinois until 1979 and then at the University of Kentucky.  In 1989, he settled at the University of Rochester, where he spent the rest of his career.

Mathematics 

Cohen did influential work in several areas of homotopy theory.  His thesis concerned the topology of configuration spaces, a topic he came back to throughout his life, with connections to braid groups and mapping class groups.  This was followed by a series of influential papers on unstable homotopy groups of spheres with John Moore and Joseph Neisendorfer.  Late in his life, Cohen studied polyhedral products in a series of articles with Bahri, Bendersky, and Gitler.

Selected publications

Personal life 

In the late 1970's, Cohen battled a spinal tumor.  Although he survived with the help of radiation therapy, he was partially paralyzed for the rest of his life.  Starting in 2013, he used a wheelchair.

Cohen was survived by his wife Kathleen and two daughters.

References 

Topologists
20th-century American mathematicians
21st-century American mathematicians
1945 births
2022 deaths
Sloan Research Fellows
Fellows of the American Mathematical Society
Brandeis University alumni
University of Chicago alumni
University of Rochester faculty